Robert Dalva (April 14, 1942 – January 27, 2023) was an American film editor. Filmography as editor includes The Black Stallion, Raising Cain, Jumanji, Jurassic Park III and Hidalgo, October Sky, and The Prize Winner of Defiance, Ohio. He also directed the film The Black Stallion Returns (1983).

Dalva was nominated for the Academy Award for Best Film Editing for his work on The Black Stallion (1979).

Dalva was an alumnus of Colgate University and member of Phi Kappa Tau fraternity.

Dalva was elected to membership in the American Cinema Editors, and was considered to be part of a core group of successful filmmakers known as The Dirty Dozen, who were film students at the University of Southern California in the 1960s.

Dalva died from lymphoma in Larkspur, California, on January 27, 2023, at the age of 80.

Filmography as editor
 Lions Love (1969)
 Forever (1978)
 The Black Stallion (1979)
 Latino (1985)
 Raising Cain (1992)
 Jumanji (1995)
 Conceiving Ada (1997)
 October Sky (1999)
 Jurassic Park III (2001)
 Hidalgo (2004)
 The Prize Winner of Defiance, Ohio (2005)
 Touching Home (2008)
 The River Why (2010) (consulting editor)
 Captain America: The First Avenger (2011)
 Knife Fight (2012)
 Lovelace (2013)
 Sweetwater (2013)
 Heist (2015)
 Precious Cargo (2016)
 Evolution of Organic (2017)
 The Hall (2019)
San Francisco Stories (2021)

Filmography as director
 The Black Stallion Returns (1983)

References

External links

1942 births
2023 deaths
American film editors
American Cinema Editors
Colgate University alumni
University of Southern California alumni
People from New York City